The 13th National Defence Commission (NDC) of North Korea was elected by the 1st Session of the 13th Supreme People's Assembly on 9 April 2014. It was replaced on 29 June 2016 by the 13th State Affairs Commission.

Officers

First Chairman

Vice Chairman

Members

Changes (2014–16)

References

Citations

Bibliography
Books:
 

13th Supreme People's Assembly
National Defence Commission
2014 establishments in North Korea
2016 disestablishments in North Korea